Karen Jane Musson (born 27 June 1967) is a New Zealand former cricketer who played as an all-rounder, batting right-handed and bowling right-arm medium. She appeared in 1 Test match and 13 One Day Internationals for New Zealand between 1993 and 1996. She played domestic cricket for Central Districts and Wellington.

References

External links

1967 births
Living people
New Zealand women cricketers
New Zealand women Test cricketers
New Zealand women One Day International cricketers
Cricketers from Hastings, New Zealand
Central Districts Hinds cricketers
Wellington Blaze cricketers